Guangxi University, known as Xida, is a provincial research university located in Nanning, Guangxi and the oldest and largest university in the Guangxi Zhuang Autonomous Region. The university helped pioneer higher education in central and southwestern China, where its faculty, students, and resources contributed to the creation of over 20 universities and academic departments during the mid 20th century. The university grants bachelor's, master's, and doctoral degrees across 27 colleges and departments and 98 undergraduate majors.

Established in 1928, the university was broken up during national education reforms in the 1950s. Its departments were relocated across China to create or bolster numerous other institutions including Wuhan University, Sun Yat-sen University, and Guangxi Normal University. Xida was re-established in 1958, and by 1995 the university was being recognized at the national level as a member of Double First Class University Plan and former Project 211, government funding initiatives to elevate research and faculty hiring standards for a select group of rising Chinese universities.

In 2017, Guangxi University was selected as a beneficiary of the Double First Class University Plan, with Double First Class funding awarded to the Department of Civil Engineering which the Chinese government seeks to elevate to "world-class" status. Four disciplines in engineering, agricultural science, and material science have been ranked in the Global Top 1% according to the Thompson Reuters InCites Essential Science Indicators (ESI). Guangxi University is consistently ranked the best in the Guangxi Zhuang Autonomous Region and among top 100th nationwide. The Academic Ranking of World Universities, also known as ShanghaiRanking, ranked Guangxi University in the top 501-600th in the world.

History

Establishment and restructuring (1928–1938) 
As early as 1925, the Guangxi provincial government began drafting plans to create Guangxi University. In the winter of 1927, the authorities invited celebrated scientist and educator Ma Junwu, a native of Guilin, Guangxi, to return to his homeland and help found the first modern university in the province. In October 1928, Guangxi University was established on Butterfly Mountain in the Hexi District of Wuzhou.

University operations were briefly suspended from 1929 to 1931 due to armed conflict in Guangxi and the neighboring Guizhou region.

In 1932, the provincial government established the Guangxi Provincial Teacher's College, an independent normal school in Guilin, Guangxi. However, in 1936, the government reorganized institutions of higher education. The Teacher's College was ordered to merge into Guangxi University, where it became part of the colleges of literature and law. The university also absorbed the Guangxi Provincial Medical College which became the Guangxi University School of Medicine. However, the authorities separated the university from its science and engineering faculties, which consolidated and became the independent Guangxi University of Science and Technology. Through these acquisitions and divestments, Guangxi University influenced the development of many institutions of higher education across Guangxi, a role it would retain during the education reorganization of the 1950s.

In 1936 Guangxi University relocated to a campus in the city of Guilin. There, the university established an Institute of Botany, several agricultural research facilities, and its Economic Research Institute.

National Guangxi University and war relocation (1939–1952) 
In 1939, the Nationalist government expanded the university, adding several faculties including engineering and agriculture. As a result, the university was renamed National Guangxi University. The 40s and 50s would prove to be a difficult period of "great contributions and sacrifices" made by the newly named university, while also establishing its modern identity and impact as a contributor to the effort to establish higher education in central and southwestern China.

By the mid-1940s, the Second Sino-Japanese War, which had begun in 1931 with the Japanese invasion of Manchuria in northeast China, had reached southern China. In the summer of 1944, an imminent Japanese invasion of Guangxi forced National Guangxi University to evacuate its Guilin campus and move south to Rong County. The university began conducting classes out of eight conference halls. By November, the nearby city of Liuzhou had begun wartime preparations. The university was forced to leave Guangxi entirely, relocating a second time to neighboring Guizhou province.

During this temporary relocation, the university decided to continue its educational mission with a particular focus on nearby ethnic minority populations in Guangxi and southwest Guizhou provinces, including the Zhuang and Miao peoples. While moored in Rong County, faculty lectured on agriculture for local farmers and the university recruited a group of minority students into the colleges of agriculture, law, and business.

With the surrender of Japan in September 1945, National Guangxi University moved back to its home province, temporarily taking up residence at a campus by the Lijiang river in Liuzhou. In early 1946, the student body initiated a movement that brought the university back to its original campus on Butterfly Mountain in Wuzhou. Subsequently, in September 1946, National Guangxi University moved back to Guilin.

The 1950s began with several acquisitions of other institutions. In 1950 the National Nanning Teacher's College merged into the university and became the Guangxi University College of Teacher Education. In 1951, the undergraduate programs of the provincial Xijiang College were absorbed. The university created the independent, but affiliated Guangxi Agricultural College in 1952.

At the beginning of 1952, Chairman Mao Zedong personally inscribed the name "Guangxi University" in Chinese calligraphy. The university continues to use this name, and his calligraphy, today.

Downsizing and suspension to support the creation of new universities (1953–1958) 
The year 1953 marked the beginning of a period of reorganization, dissolution, and eventual suspension of Guangxi University. That year, the nascent People's Republic of China began an unprecedented reorganization of Chinese higher education institutions on a national scale, with the goal of expanding access to higher education through the establishment of new colleges and universities.

As a relatively well-developed university with comprehensive academic departments, a large student body, and extensive materials, Guangxi University was called upon to sacrifice a significant portion of its resources in support of this national project. In the reallocation, a large portion of Guangxi University faculty, students, and equipment were sent away to 19 newly created institutions across central and southwestern China. The university underwent significant downsizing as a result.

On October 17, 1953, a total of 53 professors across the departments of history, foreign language, physics, chemistry, and mathematics, as well as 256 professors and instructors of the College of Teacher Education were separated from the university to form the new Guangxi Teacher's College (now Guangxi Normal University). Subsequently, the majority of academic departments at Guangxi University were relocated. The university gave up its mechanical engineering department, which was one of the earliest in China, as well as its electrical engineering department. The faculty, students, and resources of these two departments were reallocated to the newly created Huazhong Institute of Technology (now the Huazhong University of Science and Technology) and other institutions. The university transferred its chemical engineering department to the South China University of Technology, and its highly regarded civil engineering department to the Central South Civil Engineering Institute (now Hunan University). The department of mining and metallurgy was sent to Central South University. The agricultural departments were relocated to Hubei province and renamed the Huazhong Agricultural University. Both Wuhan University and Sun Yat-sen University split the personnel and resources of several departments.

Having sacrificed the majority of its faculty and students, the remnants of Guangxi University discontinued operations. The depleted university entered a dormant stage until 1958, awaiting reconstruction of its faculty and student body.

Revival and restoration (1958–1999) 
In 1958, the Central People's Government approved a plan to reconstruct and reopen Guangxi University at a new campus in the city of Nanning. The first step was to rebuild the engineering departments. In 1961, Guangxi University absorbed the Guangxi Institute of Technology and the Guangxi University of Science and Technology. Ironically, the latter university was composed of former departments of engineering that had been split from Guangxi University two decades ago. The university absorbed the Guangxi Forestry College in 1962, which became the basis for a new college of agriculture within the university.

In 1970, the Guangxi Labor University was merged into Guangxi Agricultural College, a separate institution affiliated with Guangxi University. The former college later changed its name to Guangxi Agricultural University.

In 1978, Guangxi University awarded its first master's degree.

In March 1997, the Ministry of Education approved the merger of Guangxi Agricultural University into Guangxi University, significantly strengthening its formerly depleted agricultural departments.

In 1998, the university awarded its first doctoral degree and was approved to establish three additional doctoral programs.

In 1999, Guangxi University was chosen to participate in Project 211, a national initiative to elevate research standards and faculty hiring resources for a select group of rising universities.

21st century 
With university-wide improvements as a result of increased government funding from Project 211, and the absorption of Guangxi Agricultural University bolstering its key agricultural departments, Guangxi University entered the 21st century.

In 2001, Guangxi University and the South China University of Technology, who had received the former university's chemical engineering department in 1953, entered into a counterpart agreement to support innovation at Guangxi University.

In 2004, the Ministry of Education approved Guangxi University to establish a new university in Guangxi with the aim of serving ethnic minority groups.

In December 2006, Guangxi University and  co-founded the Confucius Institute in Suphanburi, Thailand. In September 2007, Guangxi University established the School of International Education, which enrolls and manages international students in university programs, teaches Chinese as a foreign language, and administers international collaboration partnerships and the university's overseas Confucius Institutes.

Colleges and Departments

Guangxi University has 26 colleges and schools:

College of Mechanical Engineering
College of Electric Engineering
College of Civil Engineering and Architecture
College of Chemistry and Chemical Engineering
College of Resources, Environment and Materials
College of Light Industry and Food Engineering
College of Computer, Electronics and Information
College of Marine Sciences
College of Life Science and Technology
College of Agriculture
College of Animal Science and Technology
College of Forestry
College of Mathematics and Information Science
College of Physical Science and Technology
College of Liberal Arts
College of Journalism and Communication
College of Foreign Languages
College of Arts
College of Public Policy and Management
Business School
Law School
School of Marxism
College of Physical Education
International College
College of Continuing Education
Medical College

Rankings and reputation

General Rankings 
Guangxi University is consistently ranked the best in the Guangxi Zhuang Autonomous Region and among top 100th nationwide. As of 2021, Guangxi University was ranked 601-650th globally by the Performance Ranking of Scientific Papers for World Universities, and 572nd in the world by the University Ranking by Academic Performance (URAP). The Academic Ranking of World Universities, also known as ShanghaiRanking, ranked Guangxi University in the top 501-600th in the world.

Generally, Guangxi University was ranked in the top 1000 universities in the world by several major international universities rankings, including the Times Higher Education, the Academic Ranking of World Universities, and the Center for World University Rankings (CWUR).

Research and Subjects Rankings 
As of 2022. the CWTS Leiden Ranking ranked Guangxi University at 486th in the world based on their publications for the period 2017–2020. The Nature Index Annual Table 2022 by Nature Research ranked Guangxi University among the top 500 leading universities globally for the high quality of research publications in natural science. The U.S. News & World Report ranked Guangxi University among the top 500 best global universities in Engineering.

Research Institutes 
China-ASEAN Research Institute

See also 

 Guangxi Normal University, at one point the Guangxi University Liberal Arts Institute

References

External links

  

 
Educational institutions established in 1928
Universities and colleges in Guangxi
Project 211
1928 establishments in China